SV Tasmania Berlin is a German football club based in the locality of Neukölln of the homonymous borough of Neukölln in Berlin, Germany. The team is currently playing in the fifth tier NOFV-Oberliga Nord.

History 

Tasmania's predecessor club, SC Tasmania 1900 Berlin, was already financially insecure in the early 1970s, and so the amateur and youth players of the team decided to establish their own club on 3 February 1973, which they named SV Tasmania 73 Neukölln. Later that year, the former Bundesliga club Tasmania 1900 was declared bankrupt and was disbanded. Many club officials and players followed suit to support the new team in Neukölln.

Tasmania 73 played the 1997–98 and 1998–99 seasons in the then fourth tier NOFV-Oberliga Nord. In December 2000, the club was renamed SV Tasmania-Gropiusstadt 1973. 2007–08 saw Tasmania-Gropiusstadt play in the Berlin-Liga (V). Following a league restructure and two relegations in succession, the club played the 2009–10 season in the 8th tier Bezirksliga Berlin Staffel 3 before finishing second and gaining promotion to the Landesliga Berlin Staffel 2 (VII) for the 2010–11 season. In 2011, the club was renamed SV Tasmania Berlin. After finishing first in the 2011–12 Landesliga season the club was promoted once again to the Berlin-Liga. Tasmania won the 2018–2019 season and was promoted to the fifth-tier NOFV-Oberliga for the 2019–2020 season.

Stadium 
Tasmania's home matches are played at the 3,000-capacity Werner-Seelenbinder-Sportpark in Berlin-Neukölln, directly next to the site of the former Berlin Tempelhof Airport.

League positions since 1978

Honours 
The club's honours:
 NOFV-Oberliga
 Champions: 2021
 Verbandsliga Berlin
 Champions: 1997, 2019
 Berliner Landespokal
 Runners-up: 2014, 2015

Further reading

References

External links 
 SV Tasmania Berlin 

Football clubs in Germany
Tasmania
Association football clubs established in 1973
1973 establishments in Germany